The 2006–07 New York Islanders season was the 35th season in the franchise's history. They qualified for the playoffs in the last game of the regular season for the first time since 2004. They lost to the Buffalo Sabres in the first round, 4–1.

Regular season
After the Islanders' upper management cleaned out the team's front office during the 2005–06 season, owner Charles Wang needed to find a new coach and general manager (GM). Initially, he hired Ted Nolan as coach and Neil Smith as GM, but Smith was removed after a few weeks on the job. Wang envisioned team management making decisions by committee, and Smith was uncomfortable working without the large amount of control that NHL managers usually have. Wang hired Garth Snow, who was the team's backup goalie the prior year, to take over. Pat LaFontaine, who had intended to return to the team as senior advisor to the owner, resigned the post the same day that Smith was fired. Reports indicated that LaFontaine decided the fit was not right for him after Wang ignored his advice to wait a few days before making a final decision about Smith.

Prior to Smith's firing, the Islanders made several free agent acquisitions, including defensemen Brendan Witt and Tom Poti and forwards Mike Sillinger and Chris Simon. Andy Hilbert, Sean Hill, Viktor Kozlov and Richard Park signed on after Smith was dismissed. Additionally, in a controversial move, the Islanders signed goaltender Rick DiPietro to a 15-year, $67.5 million contract, among the longest in professional sports history.

The Islanders opened the season on a losing streak, but then began to play well enough to temporarily move into first place in the Atlantic Division by December. On December 16, 2006, the Islanders traded Alexei Zhitnik to the Philadelphia Flyers for defenseman Freddy Meyer and a conditional third round draft pick. On December 20, they then traded forward Mike York to the Flyers for forward Randy Robitaille and a fifth-round pick in 2008.

Starting at the end of December, the Islanders went on a seven-game losing streak, which ended with a victory over the Rangers. Since then, the Islanders hovered around the last playoff spot. In advance of the February NHL trade deadline, the Isles made a pair of deals with the Edmonton Oilers. On February 18, 2007, the Islanders traded defense prospect Denis Grebeshkov for defenseman Marc-Andre Bergeron and a third-round pick in 2008.

Sitting in sixth place in the Eastern Conference at the trade deadline, the team sent a first-round draft pick and prospects Robert Nilsson and Ryan O'Marra to the Oilers for NHL All-Star Ryan Smyth and acquired Richard Zednik for a second-round pick. However, the team suffered a series of losses down the stretch. Journalists cited two reasons for the team's apparent demise: Chris Simon's suspension for striking Ryan Hollweg with his stick, and Rick DiPietro's multiple concussions, which forced him to miss several crucial games. Backup goaltender Mike Dunham had several poor showings with DiPietro out, which prompted the team to call on third-stringer Wade Dubielewicz, who fared better.

Coming into the last four games of the season, the Islanders play had improved, but a playoff spot still appeared out of reach. However, the team won each game and received some help from the Montreal Canadiens and Toronto Maple Leafs, who failed to win enough games to edge the Isles out. The Isles clinched with a shootout win over the New Jersey Devils, in which Dubielewicz poke-checked Sergei Brylin to secure the victory. The team expressed pride that they qualified because many NHL preview predictions had the Isles slated to finish at or near the bottom of the standings. They lost their first round matchup with the Buffalo Sabres, however, the NHL's best team during the regular season, in five games.

Season standings

Schedule and results

October

November

December

January

February

March

April

 Green background indicates win.
 Red background indicates regulation loss.
 White background indicates overtime/shootout loss.

Playoffs

The New York Islanders earned the eighth seed in the Eastern Conference.

Eastern Conference Quarter-finals: vs. (1) Buffalo Sabres

Buffalo wins series 4–1

Player stats

Regular season
Scoring

Goaltending

Playoffs
Scoring

Goaltending

Transactions

Trades

Acquisitions

Departures

Draft picks
The Islanders' picks at the 2006 NHL Entry Draft in Vancouver, British Columbia.

External links
 Official website of the New York Islanders

See also
 2006–07 NHL season

References
 Game log: New York Islanders game log on espn.com
 Team standings: NHL standings on espn.com

New York Islanders seasons
New York Islanders
New York Islanders
New York Islanders
New York Islanders